Yang Sung-chul (born 20 November 1939) is a South Korean political scientist, politician, and diplomat.

Early life and career
Yang was born in Gokseong County, Jeollanam-do in 1939. He did his undergraduate studies at Seoul National University's Department of Political Science. While in college, he volunteered to serve in the Korean Army from 1960-1962 as a student draftee. He began working at the Hankook Ilbo as a reporter in October 1963, but received a scholarship in 1965 to study at the University of Hawaii at Manoa's East–West Center for his master's degree. It was there that he first met Kim Dae-jung, of whom he would go on to become a political supporter; Kim was visiting Hawaii at the time at the invitation of the U.S. Department of State. He went on to the University of Kentucky for his doctoral studies, where he defended a dissertation comparing the South Korean April Revolution of 1960 which led to the resignation of Syngman Rhee and the May 16 coup the following year which brought Park Chung-hee to power.

Upon receiving his Ph.D., he taught at the Eastern Kentucky University in Richmond for four years and returned to the University of Kentucky system in 1975 to 1987 where he was a full professor and a member of the University of Kentucky graduate faculty. He also taught at Northwestern University in Evanston, Illinois, Indiana University in Bloomington, and Pembroke State University in Pembroke, North Carolina. While in the United States, he was one of the founding members of the Association of the Korean Political Scientists in North America and served as its Secretary-General. Yang married after moving to the United States, and had two children there. He naturalised as a U.S. citizen in 1977.

Yang returned to South Korea in 1986 as a visiting professor at Seoul National University. Later that same year, he accepted a professorship at the Graduate Institute of Peace Studies at Kyung Hee University, where he was an academic dean until 1996. He gave up U.S. citizenship in 1989.

In the National Assembly
Yang was elected to the 15th National Assembly in the 1996 elections. He served on the National Assembly's Foreign Affairs and Unification Committee. In 1998, he became acting head of the Jeollanam-do branch of the National Congress for New Politics, replacing Han Hwa-gap (한화갑).

Ambassadorship

In May 2000, just in advance of the first Inter-Korean summit, South Korean newspapers began to report that Yang had been chosen as Seoul's next ambassador to the United States. Yang's appointment was a surprise due to his relative lack of political and diplomatic experience. Stratfor analysed Kim's choice to nominate Yang, along with the naming of four-decade career diplomat and trade expert Hong Soong-young as ambassador to Beijing, as part of an effort to push forward the Sunshine Policy: the posting to Washington of Yang, an expert on North Korean affairs, symbolised the autonomy of Seoul's policies towards Pyongyang, while Hong's role was to improve relations with Beijing and ensure its support for inter-Korean reconciliation. Yang's term as ambassador came to an end in April 2003, when he was succeeded by Han Sung-joo.

Later career
After leaving his ambassadorial post, Yang and his wife returned to South Korea. He went on to become a professor at Korea University's Graduate School of International Studies. He also served as the chairperson of the Kim Dae-jung Peace Foundation Advisory Committee from August 2007 to 2012.

Drs. Sung-Chul Yang and Daisy Lee Yang Lecture Series endowment fund agreement with UH Foundation, dated July 28, 2015(“Original Agreement) and amended gift agreement on June 8th 2021 was to support the promotion and advancement of Korean Studies at the Center for Korean Studies at the University of Hawaii at Manoa Campus. This lecture series was created to invite an eminent scholar of Korean or Asian affairs to deliver a lecture.

Selected works

 English
 

As editor. 
With James Lilley et al. 

 Korean
With Pak Han-sik et al. 

With Park Sung-Jo. 

Co-edited with Kang Sung-hak. 
With Lee Yong-pil. 

 With 이정복. 

With 이상근

Honors and awards

 Distinguished Alumni Award on the occasion of Gokseong Elementary School's Centennial, 2012, Gokseong County
 Distinguished Alumni Award of Kwangju High School, 1998, Kwangju High School Alumni Association
 Outstanding Alumnus of Kwangju High School, 2004, Kwangju High School Alumni Association in Seoul-Gyeonggi Region
 Kwangju High School Distinguished Alumni Achievement Award, 2021
 Hall of Distinguished Alumni, University of Kentucky 2010, Lexington, Kentucky
 Fifty Years, Fifty Stories, East-West Center, 2010, in commemoration of the East-West Center's 50th Anniversary 
 Person of the Year 2000 for Gokseong County, South Cholla Province, Korea
 건국 포장(ROK Presidential Award) On the Occasion of the 3rd Anniversary of the April Student Revolution, 1963

References 

1939 births
Living people
Ambassadors of South Korea to the United States
Academic staff of Korea University
Members of the National Assembly (South Korea)
People from South Jeolla Province
Former United States citizens
Seoul National University alumni
University of Hawaiʻi at Mānoa alumni
University of Kentucky alumni